Kenny Mims is a veteran music producer, composer and session player born in Muscle Shoals, Alabama in 1953. He has produced for Kenny Rogers and Marty Robbins and played guitar for Hank Williams, Jr., Kenny Rogers and Tanya Tucker.

His first work was with "southern soul" artist Bobby Lance on "Rolling Man" [Atlantic SD7218, 1972]. Mims was instrumental in creating the Bonepony southern stomp rock style, writing, producing and performing on most of the songs for their debut album "Stomp Revival".

References

1953 births
Living people
People from Muscle Shoals, Alabama
Guitarists from Alabama
Record producers from Alabama
20th-century American guitarists